The 2017 Seattle Sounders FC 2 season is the club's third year of existence, and their third season in the United Soccer League, the second tier of the United States Soccer Pyramid. Including previous Seattle Sounders franchises, this is the 37th season of a soccer team playing in the Seattle metro area.

Current roster

Competitions

USL regular season

Standings

Results summary

Results by matchday

Matches

Statistics

Appearances and goals

Numbers after plus-sign(+) denote appearances as a substitute.

|-
|colspan="14"|Players who left the club during the season:

Top scorers
{| class="wikitable" style="font-size: 95%; text-align: center;"
|-
!width=30|Place
!width=30|Position
!width=30|Number
!width=175|Name
!width=75|
!width=75|
!width=75|Total
|-
|rowspan="1"|1
|MF
|32
|align="left"| Zach Mathers
|11
|0
|11
|-
|rowspan="1"|2
|MF
|38
|align="left"| Irvin Parra
|6
|0
|6
|-
|rowspan="1"|3
|FW
|99
|align="left"| Felix Chenkam
|5
|0
|5
|-
|rowspan="1"|4
|FW
|71
|align="left"| David Olsen
|4
|0
|4
|-
|rowspan="1"|5
|DF
|34
|align="left"| Brian Nana-Sinkam
|3
|0
|3
|-
|rowspan="3"|6
|MF
|23
|align="left"| Henry Wingo
|2
|0
|2
|-

|DF
|53
|align="left"| Sam Rogers
|2
|0
|2
|-

|MF
|88
|align="left"| Ray Saari
|2
|0
|2
|-
|rowspan="7"|9
|DF
|5
|align="left"| Nouhou Tolo
|1
|0
|1
|-

|FW
|12
|align="left"| Seyi Adekoya
|1
|0
|1
|-

|FW
|37
|align="left"| Shandon Hopeau
|1
|0
|1
|-

|DF
|43
|align="left"| Paul Rothrock
|1
|0
|1
|-

|MF
|73
|align="left"| Riley Grant
|1
|0
|1
|-

|DF
|77
|align="left"| Francisco Narbón
|1
|0
|1
|-

|DF
|78
|align="left"| Charles Renken
|1
|0
|1
|-
!colspan="4"|Total
! 42
! 0
! 42

Disciplinary record
{| class="wikitable" style="text-align:center;"
|-
| rowspan="2" !width=15|
| rowspan="2" !width=15|
| rowspan="2" !width=120|Player
| colspan="3"|Regular Season
| colspan="3"|Playoffs
| colspan="3"|Total
|-
!width=34; background:#fe9;"|
!width=34; background:#fe9;"|
!width=34; background:#ff8888;"|
!width=34; background:#fe9;"|
!width=34; background:#fe9;"|
!width=34; background:#ff8888;"|
!width=34; background:#fe9;"|
!width=34; background:#fe9;"|
!width=34; background:#ff8888;"|
|-
|| 12 || |FW ||align=left| Seyi Adekoya || |1|| |0|| |0|| |0|||0|| |0|| |1|| |0|| |0
|-
|| 15 || |DF ||align=left| Tony Alfaro || |1|| |0|| |0|| |0|||0|| |0|| |1|| |0|| |0
|-
|| 21 || |DF ||align=left| Jordy Delem || |2|| |0|| |1|| |0|||0|| |0|| |2|| |0|| |1
|-
|| 31 || |DF ||align=left| Lorenzo Ramos || |2|| |0|| |0|| |0|||0|| |0|| |2|| |0|| |0
|-
|| 32 || |MF ||align=left| Zach Mathers || |4|| |0|| |0|| |0|||0|| |0|| |4|| |0|| |0
|-
|| 34 || |DF ||align=left| Brian Nana-Sinkam || |2|| |0|| |0|| |0|||0|| |0|| |2|| |0|| |0
|-
|| 36 || |DF ||align=left| Denso Ulysse || |3|| |0|| |0|| |0|||0|| |0|| |3|| |0|| |0
|-
|| 38 || |MF ||align=left| Irvin Parra || |7|| |0|| |0|| |0|||0|| |0|| |7|| |0|| |0
|-
|| 40 || |MF ||align=left| Azriel Gonzalez || |0|| |0|| |1|| |0|||0|| |0|| |0|| |0|| |1
|-
|| 41 || |MF ||align=left| Jamie Dimitroff || |1|| |0|| |0|| |0|||0|| |0|| |1|| |0|| |0
|-
|| 42 || |MF ||align=left| Kei Tomozawa || |1|| |0|| |0|| |0|||0|| |0|| |1|| |0|| |0
|-
|| 45 || |MF ||align=left| Camilo Santiago || |1|| |0|| |0|| |0|||0|| |0|| |1|| |0|| |0
|-
|| 47 || |DF ||align=left| Christian Koontz || |3|| |0|| |0|| |0|||0|| |0|| |3|| |0|| |0
|-
|| 53 || |DF ||align=left| Sam Rogers || |1|| |0|| |0|| |0|||0|| |0|| |1|| |0|| |0
|-
|| 59 || |DF ||align=left| Jackson Ragen || |1|| |0|| |0|| |0|||0|| |0|| |1|| |0|| |0
|-
|| 70 || |MF ||align=left| Guy Serge Edoa || |1|| |0|| |0|| |0|||0|| |0|| |1|| |0|| |0
|-
|| 71 || |FW ||align=left| David Olsen || |1|| |0|| |0|| |0|||0|| |0|| |1|| |0|| |0
|-
|| 73 || |DF ||align=left| Riley Grant || |2|| |0|| |0|| |0|||0|| |0|| |2|| |0|| |0
|-
|| 77 || |MF ||align=left| Francisco Narbón || |4|| |0|| |0|| |0|||0|| |0|| |4|| |0|| |0
|-
|| 78 || |MF ||align=left| Charles Renken || |1|| |0|| |0|| |0|||0|| |0|| |1|| |0|| |0
|-
|| 88 || |MF ||align=left| Ray Saari || |6|| |1|| |0|| |0|||0|| |0|| |6|| |1|| |0
|-
|| 92 || |DF ||align=left| Rodrigue Ele || |4|| |1|| |0|| |0|||0|| |0|| |4|| |1|| |0
|-
|| 99 || |FW ||align=left| Felix Chenkam || |3|| |0|| |0|| |0|||0|| |0|| |3|| |0|| |0
|-
!colspan=3|Total !!52!!2!!2!!0!!0!!0!!52!!2!!2

Honors and awards

Player of the Week

Save of the Week

Save of the Month

Team of the Week

References

2017 USL season
American soccer clubs 2017 season
2017 in sports in Washington (state)
Sounders
Soccer in Washington (state)
Tacoma Defiance seasons